Buzuruga is an Ward in Ilemela District, Mwanza Region, Tanzania with a postcode number 33213. In 2016 the Tanzania National Bureau of Statistics report there were 22,410 people in the ward.

Villages 
The ward has 5 villages.

 Buzuruga Kaskazini
 Buzuruga Kusini
 Nyambiti
 Ustawi
 Buzuruga Mashariki

References

Wards of Mwanza Region
Ilemela District
Constituencies of Tanzania